Duli  is a Village Development Committee in Western Rukum District in Karnali Province of western Nepal. At the time of the 2011 Nepal census it had a population of 4837 people residing in 851 individual households.

References

Populated places in Western Rukum District